Mesguich is a surname. Notable people with the surname include: 

Daniel Mesguich (born 1952), French actor and director
William Mesguich (born 1972), French actor and director, son of Daniel